Linos Chalwe (born 17 September 1980) is a Zambian football (also called soccer) striker.

He was part of the Zambian 2006 African Nations Cup team, who finished third in group C in the first round of competition, thus failing to secure qualification for the quarter-finals.

Clubs
1999-2000:  Lusaka Dynamos
2000-2001:  Mochudi Centre Chiefs SC
2001:       Nchanga Rangers
2002:       Zamsure Lusaka
2002–2004:  Green Buffaloes
2003:       Perlis (loan)
2004–2005:  Manning Rangers
2005–2006:  Bush Bucks
2006–2008:  Etoile du Sahel
2008–2009:  Bay United
2010-2011:  Al-Karamah
2012:       NAPSA Stars
2013-2015:  Green Buffaloes

External links

1980 births
Living people
Zambian footballers
Zambia international footballers
2006 Africa Cup of Nations players
Étoile Sportive du Sahel players
Expatriate soccer players in South Africa
Expatriate footballers in Tunisia
Zambian expatriate footballers
Zambian expatriate sportspeople in South Africa
Zambian expatriate sportspeople in Tunisia
Green Buffaloes F.C. players
Manning Rangers F.C. players
Bush Bucks F.C. players
Association football forwards
Bay United F.C. players
Sportspeople from Lusaka